Angel in Exile is a 1948 American Western film directed by Allan Dwan and Philip Ford and written by Charles Larson. The film stars John Carroll, Adele Mara, Thomas Gomez, Barton MacLane, Alfonso Bedoya and Grant Withers. The film was released on September 3, 1948, by Republic Pictures.

Plot

Cast    
John Carroll as Charlie Dakin
Adele Mara as Raquel Chavez
Thomas Gomez as Dr. Estaban Chavez
Barton MacLane as Max Giorgio
Alfonso Bedoya as Ysidro Álvarez
Grant Withers as Sheriff
Paul Fix as Carl Spitz
Art Smith as Emie Coons
Tom Powers as Warden
Ian Wolfe as Health Officer
Howland Chamberlain as J. H. Higgins
Elsa Lorraine Zepeda as Carmencita
Mary Currier as Nurse

References

External links 
 

1948 films
American Western (genre) films
1948 Western (genre) films
Republic Pictures films
Films directed by Allan Dwan
Films directed by Philip Ford
Films scored by Nathan Scott
American black-and-white films
1940s English-language films
1940s American films